Chelishchevo is the name of several rural localities in Russia:
Chelishchevo, Kaluga Oblast, a village in Iznoskovsky District of Kaluga Oblast
Chelishchevo, Oryol Oblast, a village in Melovskoy Selsoviet of Khotynetsky District of Oryol Oblast
Chelishchevo, Vologda Oblast, a village in Roslyatinsky Selsoviet of Babushkinsky District of Vologda Oblast